Feraklos Castle, also Feraklou (Φερακλού) and Faraklenon Castle (Φαρακλενόν Kάστρο), is a ruined medieval fortress, located on an 85 m-high hill overlooking the village of Charaki on the east coast of the island of Rhodes, Greece.

History
The fortress was originally built in the Byzantine era. It was captured by the Knights Hospitaller on 20 September 1306, being their first possession on the island that would become their base. By 1408 it was in ruins, and was repaired under the Grand Masters Giovanni Battista Orsini (1467–76) and Pierre d'Aubusson (1476–1503) as a stronghold to protect the area, and particularly watch over the anchorages at the Charaki and Agia Agathi beaches nearby. After 1470, the Hospitallers abandoned all other fortifications on the island except for Feraklos, nearby Lindos, and the city of Rhodes, which in turn were further strengthened. A decree of 1474 prescribed that the Feraklos Castle was the place of refuge by the inhabitants of the villages of Malona, Salia, Katagros, Zinodotou, and Kaminari when there was danger.

The fort was captured by the Ottoman Empire in 1523 after a long siege, a few months after the capture of Rhodes.  The Ottomans did not use the castle and it has since been abandoned.

Layout
The fortress has an irregular polygonal layout, with a wall perimeter of 680 m encompassing an area of 1,700 square meters. The northern and western portions date to Byzantine times, but the rest are additions or modifications by the Hospitallers. A single gate and two cylindrical towers survive in the southern portion of the walls, along with a cistern in the interior.

References

External links

Gallery 

Buildings and structures in Rhodes
Rhodes under the Knights Hospitaller
Byzantine castles in Greece
15th-century fortifications in Greece